Radosław Truszkowski (born October 5, 1978 in Olsztyn) is a retired amateur Polish Greco-Roman wrestler, who competed in the men's middleweight category. Truszkowski represented his nation Poland at the 2004 Summer Olympics, and later captured a silver medal in the 74-kg division at the 2005 Summer Universiade in Izmir, Turkey. Throughout his sporting career, Truszkowski trained full-time for Cement Gryf Wrestling Club in Chełm, under his personal coach and 1988 Olympic silver medalist Andrzej Głąb.

Truszkowski qualified for the Polish squad in the men's 74 kg class at the 2004 Summer Olympics in Athens. Earlier in the process, he placed fifth from the Olympic Qualification Tournament in Novi Sad, Serbia and Montenegro to guarantee a spot on Poland's Olympic wrestling team. Truszkowski lost two straight matches to reigning Olympic champion Filiberto Azcuy of Cuba (0–6), and South Korea's Choi Duk-hoon (1–6), leaving him on the bottom of the pool and placing eighteenth in the final standings.

At the 2005 Summer Universiade in Izmir, Turkey, Truszkowski picked up a silver medal in the 74-kg division, losing the final match to the host nation's Şeref Tüfenk in front of the home audience.

References

External links
 
 PKO Profile 

1978 births
Living people
Olympic wrestlers of Poland
Wrestlers at the 2004 Summer Olympics
Sportspeople from Olsztyn
Polish male sport wrestlers
Universiade medalists in wrestling
Universiade silver medalists for Poland
Medalists at the 2005 Summer Universiade
20th-century Polish people
21st-century Polish people